The 2003 Bandy World Championship was a competition between bandy playing nations for men. The championship was played in Arkhangelsk, Russia from the 24–30 March 2003. Sweden won the championship.  There were 9 countries participating in the 2003 championships: Finland, Kazakhstan, Norway, Russia, Sweden (group A) and Belarus, Estonia, the Netherlands and the United States (group B).

The competition was originally intended to be played in Norway. However, on 7 January 2002, the Bandy Association of Norway met and decided to not host the competition. Both Russia and Sweden showed their interests to host. The decision fell on Russia. By playing the tournament in late March, severe cold was avoided, unlike the 1999 World Championship when the tournament was played in late January and early February.

Squads

Group A

Premier tour
 24 March
 Finland – Kazakhstan 	4 – 2
 Russia – Norway 	8 – 1

 25 March
 Sweden – Finland 	9 – 4
 Kazakhstan – Russia 	3 – 12

 26 March
 Norway – Kazakhstan 	5 – 6
 Russia – Sweden 	2 – 6

 27 March
 Finland – Norway 	5 – 1
 Sweden – Kazakhstan 	6 – 1

 28 March
 Sweden – Norway 	6 – 2
 Russia – Finland 	5 – 1

Final Tour

Semifinals
 29 March
Semifinals
 Russia – Finland 	7 – 3
 Sweden – Kazakhstan 	6 – 1

Match for 3rd place
 30 March
 Finland – Kazakhstan 	1 – 4

Final
 30 March
 Russia – Sweden 	4 – 5

Group B

Premier tour
 24 March
 Estonia – Belarus	4 – 21
 25 March
 USA – Netherlands 	18 – 0
 26 March
 Netherlands – Estonia 3 – 7
 27 March
 USA – Belarus 	4 – 6
 28 March
 Estonia – USA 	0 – 15
 29 March
 Netherlands – Belarus 1 – 9

Play off matches

Match for 7th Place
February 28
 USA – Estonia 19–3

Match for 5th place
February 28
 Norway – Belarus 7–3

References

2003
2003 in bandy
2003 in Russian sport
World Championship,2003
March 2003 sports events in Russia